60601 may refer to:
 The year in the 61st millennium
 The Chicago Loop
 IEC60601, a series of international standards related to medical devices.